Meallan Liath Coire Mhic Dhughaill (801 m) is a mountain in the Northwest Highlands, Scotland. It lies in the far north of Scotland between Lairg and Durness in Sutherland.

Meallan Liath Coire Mhic Dhughaill is the hill with the longest name in Scotland.

References

Mountains and hills of the Northwest Highlands
Marilyns of Scotland
Corbetts